Pedro Paulo is a Portuguese given name, the equivalent of "Peter Paul" in English.

The name is worn by:
 Pedro Paulo (footballer, born 1973) (1973–2000), Angolan football midfielder
 Pedro Paulo (footballer, born 1985) (born 1985), Brazilian football striker
 Pedro Paulo (footballer, born 1994), Brazilian footballer
 Pedro Paulo Diniz (born 1970), Brazilian Formula One racing driver
 Pedro Paulo Rangel (born 1948), Brazilian actor featured in Pedra sobre Pedra, Cama de Gato or O Sorriso do Lagarto
 Pedro Paulo (trumpet player) (born 1939), Brazilian trumpet player featured on Ben é Samba Bom or Sacundin Ben Samba 

Portuguese masculine given names